Berea Sandstone, also known as Berea Grit, is a sandstone formation in the U.S. states of Michigan, Ohio, Pennsylvania, West Virginia, and Kentucky. It is named after Berea, Ohio. The sandstone has been used as a building stone and is a source of oil and gas.

Description

In the Appalachian Basin, Berea Sandstone is present in eastern Ohio, western Pennsylvania, western West Virginia, and eastern Kentucky. In the Michigan Basin, the sandstone is present in the eastern part of the state, thickest near Michigan's Thumb. The two deposits are separated by the Cincinnati Arch and are disconnected from each other. The sandstone overlies the Bedford Shale and the Ohio Shale and underlies the Sunbury Shale. Berea Sandstone is light gray to buff-colored in the form of siltstone and fine- to medium-grained sandstone. In places it is hard to distinguish from the underlying Bedford Shale. Berea Sandstone is classified as a member of the Waverly Group.

The sandstone was named "Berea Grit" by Ohio geologist J. S. Newberry in 1874. He named it after Berea, Ohio, for its extensive quarries of the stone.

In Michigan, the petroleum industry has referred to the Ellsworth Shale as "Berea", but this formation is distinct from Berea Sandstone and is laterally separated by Antrim Shale.

Age and formation

Berea Sandstone was formed in the Late Devonian period. Prior to the 1970s, it was assigned a Mississippian age. The Devonian-Carboniferous boundary was realigned based on research from Europe, but various geologists were not aware of the changes and so incorrectly assigned Berea Sandstone to the Kinderhookian (early Mississippian).

The majority of the sand which formed the Berea Sandstone came from the north, flowing in a river from the highlands of eastern Canada. It was deposited in a river delta environment. Pepper, et al., hypothesized that the river flowed first into the Ohio basin before switching course to the Michigan basin, thus the Michigan Berea Sandstone would be slightly younger. There is a downwarp in the Cincinnati arch, called the Ontario sag, that if it was present at the formation of Berea Sandstone, could mean that it formed a continuous belt of sediment between the Appalachian and Michigan basins. Nevertheless, subsequent erosion disconnected the two deposits.

Fossils
Berea Sandstone is generally unfossiliferous. However some fossils have been found, including fish of the genera Ctenacanthus and Gonatodus, plants of the genus Annularia, and some brachiopods.

Uses

Buildings constructed of Berea Sandstone include the Johnson County Courthouse in Iowa and the Brown County Courthouse in South Dakota. The Centre Block building of the Parliament of Canada, both before and after reconstruction, uses Berea Sandstone as window and door trim.

Berea Sandstone has also been used as flagstone and for paving. Fine grained stone has been used for grindstones and whetstones.

Industry

Quarrying

Quarrying of Berea Sandstone began in 1830. Until around 1840 or 1845, only grindstones were produced before diversifying into building and flagstones. More than a dozen different companies quarried the sandstone, before all consolidating into the Cleveland Stone Company by 1893, which was the largest sandstone producer in the United States at the time.

Oil and gas
Berea Sandstone is a host of oil and natural gas. Commercial gas development began in 1859–60 with a well at East Liverpool, Ohio. Oil was discovered in the Berea Sandstone in 1860 in Mecca Township, Trumbull County, Ohio. In Michigan, Berea Sandstone oil was first discovered in 1925 at Saginaw; this field accounted for the entirety of Michigan's oil production until 1927. By 2011, oil production from Berea Sandstone led northeastern Kentucky to be the most productive region of that state.

See also
List of sandstones

References

Bibliography

External links

Geologic formations of Michigan
Devonian Michigan
Geologic formations of Ohio
Devonian Ohio
Geologic formations of Pennsylvania
Devonian geology of Pennsylvania
Geologic formations of West Virginia
Devonian West Virginia
Geologic formations of Kentucky
Devonian Kentucky
Sandstone formations of the United States